HMS Hare (J389) was a turbine engine-powered  during the Second World War. She survived the war and was sold to Nigeria in 1958 as HMNS Nigeria.

Design and description

The ships' complement consisted of 85 officers and ratings.

The reciprocating ships had two vertical triple-expansion steam engines, each driving one shaft, using steam provided by two Admiralty three-drum boilers.

The Algerine class was armed with a QF  Mk V anti-aircraft gun and four twin-gun mounts for Oerlikon 20 mm cannon. The latter guns were in short supply when the first ships were being completed and they often got a proportion of single mounts. By 1944, single-barrel Bofors 40 mm mounts began replacing the twin 20 mm mounts on a one for one basis. All of the ships were fitted for four throwers and two rails for depth charges.

Construction and career

Service in the Royal Navy 
The ship was ordered on 30 April 1942 at the Harland & Wolff at Belfast, Ireland. She was laid down on 27 November 1943 and launched on 20 June 1944. Hare was commissioned on 10 November 1944.

Few days later on the 29th, the same exercise took place but without Seabear and Imperialist.

From 27 to 29 January 1945,  conducted anti-submarine exercises off Campbeltown with Hare and Wave.  joined the exercise on the last day. On 2 February,  conducted anti-submarine exercises off Campbeltown with Hare and again on the 5th including Wave. On the 13th, Uproar conducted anti-submarine exercises off Campbeltown with Hare and Wave.

Hare was decommissioned on 26 February 1946.

She was then sold to Nigeria in May 1958 with the transfer ceremony took place in Portsmouth.

Service in the Nigerian Navy 
Hare was renamed HMNS Nigeria and was commissioned on 21 July 1958. To commemorate the occasion and as a gesture from the Royal Navy, 's 1940 silver bell was presented to HMNS Nigeria for the return of the independent Government and people of the Federation of Nigeria.

The ship was decommissioned in 1962 and returned to the United Kingdom. She arrived in Faslane on 6 November 1972.

References

Bibliography
 
 
 Peter Elliott (1977) Allied Escort Ships of World War II. MacDonald & Janes,

External links
 

 

Algerine-class minesweepers of the Royal Navy
Ships built in Belfast
1944 ships
World War II minesweepers of the United Kingdom
Ships of the Nigerian Navy